Patricio Javier Gutiérrez Olivos (born March 20, 1983) is a Chilean footballer. Gutiérrez can be utilized as a defender or midfielder. His nickname is "Pato."

Career

Club career
Gutiérrez began his career in the youth ranks of Deportes Antofagasta and debuted on the adult squad in 2005.  However, he did not get many chances with the first team and in 2007 moved to Primera B side Unión La Calera.   Because of his good form he was signed by Primera División side Audax Italiano, where he immediately found his spot in the starting eleven.

References

External links
 BDFA profile

1983 births
Living people
People from Curicó
Chilean footballers
Colo-Colo footballers
Cobresal footballers
Audax Italiano footballers
Unión La Calera footballers
Curicó Unido footballers
Deportes Iquique footballers
Rangers de Talca footballers
San Marcos de Arica footballers
C.D. Antofagasta footballers
San Luis de Quillota footballers
Independiente de Cauquenes footballers
Primera B de Chile players
Chilean Primera División players
Segunda División Profesional de Chile players
Association football defenders